Iman Afsarian (born 1974) is a realist Iranian painter. He is also the artistic director, editor, author, and a critic for the prestigious Iranian quarterly art magazine Herfeh: Honarmand since its first issue in 2003.

Background
Afsarian was born in Tehran. He took his undergraduate studies at Tehran University of Arts, where he graduated with a Bachelors of Arts degree in painting in 1996, and later a MA in illustration in 2000.

Works
As an artist and after entering the Iranian art movement of the 2000s, Afsarian tried to strengthen and promote what is referred to as figurative, realistic or naturalistic style of painting.

Exhibitions and awards
Afsarian has held numerous solo exhibitions and has participated in group exhibitions in many countries such as the US, UK, Austria, Russia, and his works are included in some reputable collections. For example, in the U.S, Moscow, and the UK he has more than 5 solo participation and exhibitions in several group exhibitions. He is also the author of a two-volume book that was published in 2016 in Persian entitled: The Quest for a New Age.

References

1974 births
Living people
Iranian painters
People from Tehran
Realist painters